The mixed team recurve competition at the 2019 European Games was held on 21 and 23 June 2019 at the Olympic Sports Complex in Minsk, Belarus.

48 archers promoted from the individual ranking round.

Records
Prior to the competition, the existing world, European and Games records were as follows:

Ranking round

Elimination round

Finals

Top half

Bottom half

References

External links
Qualification round results
Bracket

Mixed team recurve